The 2009 Indian general election in Rajasthan, occurred for 25 seats in the state.

Result
Indian National Congress won 20 seats, Bharatiya Janata Party won 4 seats and remaining 1 seat was won by an Independent.

Elected MPs

References

Indian general elections in Rajasthan
2000s in Rajasthan
Raj